Joseph Turner (c. 1729–1807) was an architect of Welsh origin who worked in the 18th century. Most of his major works were in North Wales, and in Chester, Cheshire.  Almost all of them were in Georgian style, with at least one work in Gothic style, in Mold, Flintshire, Wales. Turner also designed memorials in Chester Cathedral, and in the churches of St Peter, Prestbury, St Margaret, Wrenbury, St Peter, Ruthin, and St Collen, Llangollen. Turner was a member of Chester Assembly.

Major works

Key

References
Citations

Sources

Welsh architects
British neoclassical architects
1807 deaths
Year of birth uncertain